Lykovo is a rural locality (a selo) and the administrative center of Lykovskoye Rural Settlement, Podgorensky District, Voronezh Oblast, Russia. The population was 337 as of 2010. There are 7 streets.

Geography 
Lykovo is located 23 km northeast of Podgorensky (the district's administrative centre) by road. Shiroky is the nearest rural locality.

References 

Rural localities in Podgorensky District